Valentine Cameron "Val" Prinsep  (14 February 18384 November 1904) was a British painter of the Pre-Raphaelite school.

Early life
Born in Calcutta, India, he was the second child of Henry Thoby Prinsep, a civil servant of the British Raj, and his wife Sarah Monckton Pattle, daughter of James Pattle. His mother was a sister of the photographer Julia Margaret Cameron and Maria Jackson (née Pattle), grandmother of Virginia Woolf and Vanessa Bell.

Henry and Sarah Prinsep returned to England in 1843. They settled in 1851 at Little Holland House, and made it a centre of artistic society.

Studies, travel, painter

Henry Thoby Prinsep was a friend of the painter George Frederic Watts, under whom his son first studied, and travelled with Watts in 1856–57 to Sir Charles Thomas Newton's excavation of Halicarnassus. He then went to Charles Gleyre's atelier in Paris. There James Abbott McNeill Whistler, Edward Poynter, and George du Maurier were among his fellow students, and he was later the original for Taffy in Du Maurier's novel Trilby. After Paris, Prinsep passed to Italy. With Edward Burne-Jones he visited Siena and there made the acquaintance of Robert Browning, of whom he saw much in Rome during the winter of 1859–60.

Prinsep was a close friend of John Everett Millais, and of Burne-Jones, with whom he travelled further in Italy. He had a share with Dante Gabriel Rossetti and others in the decoration of the hall of the Oxford Union. With other members of the Pre-Raphaelite Brotherhood, he taught at the Working Men's College during the mid-19th century. He first exhibited at the Royal Academy of Arts in 1862 with his Bianca Capella, his first picture, which attracted notice as a portrait (1866) of General Gordon in Chinese costume. Prinsep lent the costume to Millais who used it in his own painting Esther.

From 1862 to his death Prinsep was an annual exhibitor at the Royal Academy. He was elected A.R.A. in 1879 and R.A. in 1894. His marriage in 1884 made Prinsep a wealthy man, and he became a company director and landowner.

Death and monument

Prinsep died at Holland Park, west London in 1904, and is buried in Brompton Cemetery, London. He was buried with his wife Florence. The distinctive Roman style monument lies on the western path between the north entrance and the central buildings. He was an enthusiastic volunteer, and one of the founders of the Artists Rifles.

Works
Prinsep's major paintings were Miriam watching the infant Moses (exhibited at the Royal Academy in 1867), A Venetian lover (1868), Bacchus and Ariadne (1869), News from abroad (1871), The linen gatherers (1876), The gleaners, and A minuet.

In 1877, Prinsep returned to India and painted a huge picture of the Delhi Durbar. It was a commission from Robert Bulwer-Lytton, 1st Earl of Lytton, the Viceroy of India. It was exhibited in 1880 at the Royal Academy, presented to Queen Victoria and afterwards hung at Buckingham Palace. This "colossal work" attracted press comment, positive and negative. Later exhibits were À Versailles, The Emperor Theophilus chooses his Wife, The Broken Idol and The Goose Girl.

Prinsep wrote two plays, Cousin Dick and Monsieur le Duc, produced at the Royal Court Theatre and the St James's Theatre theatres respectively; two novels; and Imperial India: an Artist's Journal (1879).

Family
Prinsep married in 1884 Florence née Leyland, daughter of Frederick Richards Leyland of Wootten Hall, Liverpool. She survived him, they had three sons.

 Frederick Thoby Leyland (b.1887)
 Anthony Leyland Val (1888–1942), married in 1911 Marie Lohr, they managed the Globe Theatre in London from 1911 to until their divorce in 1928. He then married Margaret Bannerman. 
 Nicholas John Andrew Leyland (born 1894), married American dancer and singer Anita Elson in 1930.

Gallery

References

Sources

External links

 Val Prinsep, R.A., Dead, The New York Times, 13 November 1904
 Artcyclopedia links to paintings
Valentine Cameron Prinsep At The First Touch of Winter, Summer Fades Away is in the collection at Gallery Oldham, Greater Manchester

1838 births
1904 deaths
Artists from Kolkata
19th-century British novelists
19th-century British painters
British male painters
19th-century British dramatists and playwrights
Artists' Rifles officers
British dramatists and playwrights
British male novelists
Burials at Brompton Cemetery
British male dramatists and playwrights
Orientalist painters
Pre-Raphaelite painters
Royal Academicians
19th-century British male artists